German submarine U-956 was a Type VIIC U-boat built for Nazi Germany's Kriegsmarine for service during World War II.
She was laid down on 20 February 1942 by Blohm & Voss, Hamburg as yard number 156, launched on 14 November 1942 and commissioned on 6 January 1943 under Oberleutnant zur See Hans-Dieter Mohs.

Design
German Type VIIC submarines were preceded by the shorter Type VIIB submarines. U-956 had a displacement of  when at the surface and  while submerged. She had two shafts and two  propellers.

U-956 was fitted with five  torpedo tubes (four fitted at the bow and one at the stern), fourteen torpedoes, one  SK C/35 naval gun, 220 rounds, and one twin  C/30 anti-aircraft gun. The boat had a complement of between forty-four and sixty.

Service history
The boat's career began with training at 5th Flotilla on 6 January 1943, followed by active service on 1 July 1943 as part of the 1st Flotilla.

Fate
U-956 surrendered on 13 May 1945 at Loch Eriboll. She was then transferred to Lisahally, Northern Ireland on 29 May 1945 as part of Operation Deadlight and sunk by naval gunfire on 17 December 1945.

Summary of raiding history

References

Notes

Citations

Bibliography

External links

German Type VIIC submarines
1944 ships
U-boats commissioned in 1944
U-boats sunk in 1945
World War II submarines of Germany
Ships built in Danzig
Operation Deadlight
World War II shipwrecks in the Atlantic Ocean
Maritime incidents in December 1945